Dobrnja is a village in the municipality of Banja Luka, Republika Srpska, Bosnia and Herzegovina.

Demographics
Ethnic groups in the village include:
74 Serbs (100%)

References

Villages in Republika Srpska
Populated places in Banja Luka